Teigne (also : Teign, Tègne, Teeñ, Tin or Tañ in Wolof  language) was the title of the monarch of the pre-colonial Kingdom of Baol,  now part of present-day Senegal.

In Wolof, "Teigne" means the support that is placed on the head to carry something heavy, a bucket of water for example, in this case, it means the Sovereign or king carries a heavy responsibility. The origin of the title "Teigne" could also come from the royal Wolof title of "Tagne" which means an individual who belongs to a royal matrilineal lineage without belonging to the ruling patrilineal lineage and this was the case with the first "Teigne" of Baol, the Wolof Demba Gueye, who belonged to the royal matrilineal lineage of the Jolof empire but did not belong to the patrilineal ruling clan of Jolof. The first Lamans of Baol were Mandingos, the Socé, from the first Laman of Baol "Xaya Manga" to the 13th and last Laman "Ñasa Maroon". After the "Laman" Socé, the Teigne began with the Wolof Demba Gueye as the 14th ruler of Baol, he was placed there by the emperor of Jolof with whom he had family ties. The Jolof empire  had vassalized the Kingdom of Baol and the other Senegambian kingdoms after the decline of the Mali Empire. Teigne Demba Gueye's reign was significant, in fact Baol is still called "Baol Demba Gueye". After the reign of the Wolof Demba Gueye ", the Serer"Laman" began their reign in Baol, probably a compromise with the emperor of Jolof as the Serer of Baol did not easily accept the reign of the Wolof.  In fact, the Serer of Baol had a village in Baol called “Here the Wolofs will not pass!” The Serer Lamanes start with the 15th ruler of Baol “Felan Joom” and end with the 26th ruler of Baol “Ñoxor Ndiaye”, who is the maternal uncle of Amary Ngoné Sobel Fall. Ñoxor Ndiaye the last Serer Sovereign of Baol has direct Wolof paternal ancestry,his Ndiaye last name comes directly from Jolof empire (Niokhor Ndiaye, son of Kuli Gniglane Ndiaye, son of Gniglane Waly Ndiaye,son of Wal Saré Ndiaye who was a Wolof Prince of the Jolof empire. The Mandingo and the Serer rulers of Baol all had different surnames because for them it was based on a matrilineal inheritance system, it was when the Wolof Fall dynasty of Cayor began to rule the Baol that from Amary Ngoné Sobel Fall, the first Damel Teigne, all the leaders of Baol were of the Wolof last name of "Fall", this was based on the Wolof inheritance system of "Geño"(patrilineal), and "meen" (matrilineal) as opposed to the Serer system which was just based on the matrilineal system and which explains why the Mandingos and Serer rulers Baol often had different last names whereas the Wolof rulers after Amary Ngoné Sobel Fall,  all had the same last name of "Fall". From Amary Ngoné Sobel Fall, Lat Dior Diop is the exception for the Kingdoms of Cayor and Baol, Lat Dior Diop is the first Damel Teigne who was not a "Fall". After him,the "Fall" Wolof patrilineal dynasty regained power with the Teigne Thieyacine Dior Galo Gana Fall, then the French placed Tanoor Goñ Dieng as the ruler of Baol, after his death, the French began to appoint chiefs of canton in Baol.  After the demise of the Mandingos and the Serer maternal dynasties of Baol who used the title of Laman, the patrilineal dynasty of the Wolofs started to rule Baol. The first Laman  of Baol were Mandingos, followed by the Wolof Demba Gueye, then the Serer which included members of the Joof family , such as : Boureh Joof (Bouré Diouf in French speaking Senegal) and Guidiane [probably Jegan] Joof  (Guidiane Diouf), during the Wagadou period, and Maad Patar Kholleh Joof the conqueror. The Faal (or Fall in French) dynasty, the only paternal dynasty of Cayor were Wolof from the neighboring kingdom of Cayor who came to the throne after the Battle of Danki in 1549. The last Teigne of Baol was the Wolof Tanor Ngone Jeng (Tanor Goñ Dieng), who reigned from 1890 to 3 July 1894.

Notes

Bibliography
Geneviève N'Diaye-Corréard, « Teigne », in Les mots du patrimoine : le Sénégal, Archives contemporaines, 2006, p. 160 
Diop, Papa Samba, « Teigne / Tegne / Tègne », in Glossaire du roman sénégalais, L'Harmattan, 2010, p. 577 
Klein, Martin A. Islam and Imperialism in Senegal Sine-Saloum, 1847–1914, Edinburgh University Press, 1968, p. 263
Phillips, Lucie Colvin, Historical dictionary of Senegal, Scarecrow Press, 1981, p. 52–71 
Bulletin de l'Institut fondamental d'Afrique noire, volume 38, 1976, pp. 493, 504-557

Serer royalty
Serer history